The Office of the Secretary of Defense Medal for Exceptional Public Service is the third highest award and highest honorary award presented by the Secretary of Defense to non-career Federal employees, private citizens, and foreign nationals for contributions, assistance, or support to Department of Defense functions that are extensive enough to warrant recognition, but are lesser in scope and impact than is required for the DoD Medal for Outstanding Public Service.  A component head of the Department of Defense is the approval authority.  This award consists of a silver medal, a miniature medal, a rosette, and a citation signed by the Secretary of Defense.  An individual may receive this award more than once.  Subsequent awards consist of the foregoing recognition devices and a bronze, silver, or gold palm, as appropriate.

See also 
Awards and decorations of the United States government

References

External links 
US Department of Defense

Awards and decorations of the United States Department of Defense